Carraroe (in Irish, and officially, meaning 'the red quarter') is a village in County Galway, Ireland, in the Irish-speaking region (Gaeltacht) of Connemara. It is known for its traditional fishing boats, the Galway Hookers. Its population is widely dispersed over the Carraroe peninsula between Cuan an Fhir Mhóir (Greatman's Bay) and Cuan Chasla (Casla Bay). Carraroe has an unusual beach, Trá an Dóilín, a biogenic gravel beach made of coralline algae known as "maerl".

Galway hookers 

Galway Hookers are a distinctive form of native Irish boat, and Carraroe hosts an annual regatta of these vessels. As of 2006 this event, which is named Féile an Dóilín after the area's "coral strand", was the largest ever regatta of Galway hookers. The main boats are the larger Báid Mhóra (big boats) and Leathbháid (half-boats), which in earlier times were used for hauling turf from the peat bogs in Connemara to the Aran Islands and The Burren of County Clare, where peat is absent. The smaller boats are the Gleoiteoga, which were traditionally used for fishing. These boats can be found at Sruthán Pier, which is the main pier in Carraroe and in the Caladh Thadhg area.

The main activity of these boats is racing, and there are several regattas along the Connemara coast.  Currach racing is held on Loch an Mhuilinn, the lake close to the village. Every year at the festival of Cruinniú na mBád, a flotilla of traditional Connemara boats race across Galway Bay from Carraroe to Kinvara.

Irish language 

Irish (specifically the Connacht dialect) is the main spoken language of Carraroe, the settlement being the most populous Irish-speaking village in the Connemara Gaeltacht.

In 2016, Carraroe was a town with one of the highest percentages of daily Irish speakers in Ireland, with 61.6 percent stating that they spoke it daily. Under the Gaeltacht Act 2012, the Gaeltacht was redefined into 26 Language Planning Areas. Of these, Carraroe area recorded the third largest proportion of daily Irish speakers in Ireland in 2016, at 65.1 percent.

There are two summer schools that teach Irish to English-speaking secondary-school students from all over Ireland. The Carraroe area is also a centre for Irish-language media, and the former national Irish-language newspaper Foinse had its head office in the village. The Irish-language radio station, RTÉ Raidió na Gaeltachta, is in nearby Casla, and the Irish-language television station, TG4, is based at Baile na hAbhann, a few kilometres east. Roman Catholic church services are in Irish only. All school lessons are conducted in Irish.

Beach 
Trá an Dóilín is a Blue Flag beach near the village which is noted for its fine "coral". Though the beach is known in English as "Coral Strand", it is actually made of coralline algae known as maerl. This biogenic gravel beach is rare and of great conservation importance.

Education 

Áras Mháirtín Uí Chadhain (Máirtín Ó Cadhain House) is one of the Gaeltacht centres of Oifig na Gaeilge Labhartha (the Department of Spoken Irish) of the National University of Ireland, Galway. The facility opened in 1977. The centre is named in honour of Máirtín Ó Cadhain, author of Cré na Cille ('Graveyard Clay').

Sport 
 Páirc an Chathanaigh is a community-owned sports ground in the village. It is the home ground of both Gaelic football club Carraroe GAA and An Ghaeltacht RFC rugby union club. It also hosted Galway United F.C.'s 1986–87 UEFA Cup soccer match against FC Groningen when Terryland Park failed to meet UEFA standards.

Local soccer club C.S. Mac Dara competes in the Galway & District League. Connemara Isles Golf Club is a nine-hole course in nearby Lettermore.

Transport 
Carraroe is served by Bus Éireann route 424 from Galway.

Popular culture
The village is mentioned in the lyrics of the Waterboys' 1993 hit "Glastonbury Song", which refers to several Irish and British sites associated with ancient Celtic ritual:
We came down from the hill of dreams
Bernadette, mother earth and you and me
Through Carraroe, down the wildwood side.

The town gives its name to the traditional tune "Carraroe Jig". The jig has been recorded by several artists, including Patrick Street, Mick Moloney and The Corrs.

Carraroe is the home of the fictional Nuala Anne McGrail, heroine of novelist Andrew Greeley's "Irish" series which began with Irish Gold in 1994.

Notable people 
Charles Lamb (1893–1964), artist, lived in Carraroe from 1921 until his death

See also
 List of towns and villages in Ireland
Tomás Mac Eoin

References

External links 

CLG An Cheathrú Rua 
Carraroe Population Stats 2006 (archived)
AnCheathrúRua.ie

Towns and villages in County Galway
Gaeltacht places in County Galway
Gaeltacht towns and villages
Articles on towns and villages in Ireland possibly missing Irish place names